Melitaea protomedia is a butterfly of the family Nymphalidae. It is found in the Amur River basin in Russia and from central and eastern China to Korea and Japan. The habitat consists of flowering meadows, forest edges and clearings.

Adults are on wing from July to August.

The larvae feed on Veronica species.

Subspecies 
 Melitaea protomedia protomedia (Russia)
 Melitaea protomedia regama Fruhstorfer, 1915 (China to Korea and Japan)

References 

Butterflies described in 1859
Melitaea